Alexios II Komnenos (14 September 1169September 1183), Latinized Alexius II Comnenus, was Byzantine emperor from 1180 to 1183. He ascended to the throne as a minor. For the duration of his short reign, the imperial power was de facto held by regents.

Biography

Early years
Born in the purple at Constantinople, Alexios was the long-awaited son of Emperor Manuel I Komnenos (who gave him a name that began with the letter alpha as a fulfillment of the AIMA prophecy) and Maria of Antioch. In 1171 he was crowned co-emperor, and in 1175 he accompanied his father at Dorylaion in Asia Minor in order to have the city rebuilt. On 2 March 1180, at the age of eleven, he was married to Agnes of France aged 10, daughter of King Louis VII of France. She was thereafter known as Anna, and after Alexios' murder three years later, Anna would be remarried to the person responsible, Andronikos, then aged 65.

Regency of Maria and Alexios
When Manuel I died in September 1180, Alexios II succeeded him as emperor. At this time, however, he was an uneducated boy with only amusement in mind. The imperial regency was then undertaken by the dowager empress and the prōtosebastos Alexios Komnenos (a namesake cousin of Alexios II), who was popularly believed to be her lover.

The regents depleted the imperial treasury by granting privileges to Italian merchants and to the Byzantine aristocracy. When Béla III of Hungary and Kilij Arslan II of Rum began raiding within the Byzantine western and eastern borders respectively, the regents were forced to ask for help to the pope and to Saladin. Furthermore, a party supporting Alexios II's right to reign, led by his half-sister Maria Komnene and her husband the caesar John, stirred up riots in the streets of the capital.

The regents managed to defeat the party on April 1182, but Andronikos Komnenos, a first cousin of Manuel I, took advantage of the disorder to aim at the crown. He entered Constantinople, received with almost divine honours, and overthrew the government. His arrival was celebrated by a massacre of the Latins in Constantinople, especially the Venetian merchants, which he made no attempt to stop.

Regency of Andronikos and death 

On 16 May 1182 Andronikos, posing as Alexios' protector, officially restored him on the throne. As for 1180, the young emperor was uninterested in ruling matters, and Andronikos effectively acted as the power behind the throne, not allowing Alexios any voice in public affairs. One after another, Andronikos suppressed most of Alexios' defenders and supporters: his half-sister Maria Komnene, the caesar John, his loyal generals Andronikos Doukas Angelos, Andronikos Kontostephanos and John Komnenos Vatatzes, while Empress Dowager Maria was put in prison.

In 1183, Alexios was compelled to condemn his own mother to death. In September 1183, Andronikos was formally proclaimed emperor before the crowd on the terrace of the Church of Christ of the Chalkè. Probably by the end of the same month, Andronikos ordered Alexios' assassination; the young emperor was secretly strangled with a bow-string and his body thrown in the Bósporos.

In the years following Alexios' mysterious disappearance, many young men resembling him tried to claim the throne. In the end, none of those pseudo-Alexioi managed to become emperor.

Portrayal in fiction
Alexios is a character in the historical novel Agnes of France (1980) by Greek writer Kostas Kyriazis. The novel describes the events of the reigns of Manuel I, Alexios II, and Andronikos I through the eyes of Agnes.

Notes

References

Further reading

 Harris, Jonathan, Byzantium and the Crusades, Bloomsbury, 2nd ed., 2014. 

 , Vols. A1, A2 & B

1169 births
1183 deaths
Komnenos dynasty
Monarchs who died as children
Medieval child monarchs
12th-century Byzantine emperors
People executed by ligature strangulation
Eastern Orthodox monarchs
Assassinated Byzantine emperors
12th-century murdered monarchs
Manuel I Komnenos
Porphyrogennetoi
Sons of Byzantine emperors